The 2017–18 NCAA Division II men's ice hockey season began on October 27, 2017 and concluded on March 3 of the following year. This was the 36th season of second-tier college ice hockey.

Regular season

Standings

See also
 2017–18 NCAA Division I men's ice hockey season
 2017–18 NCAA Division III men's ice hockey season

References

External links

 
NCAA